Corey Dolgon is an American author and sociologist.

Early life
Dolgon was born in Brooklyn, NY. He grew up in Brooklyn and on Long Island before moving to Cherry Hill, NJ, where he graduated from Cherry Hill West High School in 1980.

Career
Dolgon's undergraduate thesis on folksongs and the American labor movement formed the foundation for a “singing lecture” that he has performed at dozens of colleges and universities and other venues around the country and around the world for almost two decades.
 
After working as a dorm director at Boston University and an organizer for the Public Interest research group in Michigan (PIRGIM), Dolgon obtained his PHD at the University of Michigan in 1987. While at the University of Michigan, Dolgon was an environmental activist, an anti-racism activist, a union organizer (Graduate Employees Organization), and a community activist.
 
He ran for Washtenaw County Commissioner in 1992. 
 
Dolgon completed his PhD in American Culture in 1994, entitled Innovators and Gravediggers: capital restructuring and class formation in Ann Arbor, Michigan, 1945-1994. Additionally, he has published numerous articles in scholarly journals, such as Junk Freedom, published in Critical Sociology, and Dim Mirrors, Dark Glasses: But This is Not Our Fate, published in Humanity & Society.
 
Dolgon worked with the Friends World Program of Long Island University from 1994 until 1997. After that, Dolgon began working as a Sociology Professor at Worcester State College [WSC] where he served as Departmental Chair from 1999 until 2009. Dolgon also served as Editor of Humanity & Society: The Journal of the Association for Humanist Sociology Humanity & Society
from 2000 to 2006, and was President of the Organization in 2008. 
 
In 2009, Dolgon became the inaugural director of Stonehill College's Office of Community Based Learning. He is also a tenured, full-professor at Stonehill College. As a scholar, Dolgon has published five books, textbooks and anthologies. His first monograph, The End of the Hamptons: Scenes from the Class Struggle in America’s Paradise, won two book awards including The Association for Humanist Sociology's 2005 Book of the Year Award and the American Sociology Association's Marxist Section Book of the Year in 2007.

Published works

 Kill It to Save It: An Autopsy of Capitalism's Triumph over Democracy (2017) 
The Cambridge Handbook on Service Learning and Community Engagement (with Tania Mitchell and Timothy Eatman) (2017)
Social Problems: A Service Learning Approach (with Chris Baker) (2010)
Pioneers of Public Sociology: The First 30 Years of Humanity & Society (with Mary Chayko)(2010)
The End of the Hamptons: Scenes from the Class Struggle in America’s Paradise (2005) (2007 American Sociological Association, Marxist Section Book Award) (2005 Association for Humanist Sociology Book Award)

Personal life
Dolgon is married to Deborah Milbauer, a public health consultant and instructor at Northeastern University. They have two daughters, Bailey Maya and Ruby Hannah Dolgon.
 
Dolgon's uncle, Herman Dolgon, was a WWII veteran who was a community organizer and activist in Sheepshead Bay, Brooklyn NY. Herman Dolgon helped organize veterans and supporters to successfully pressure the New York City Housing Authority to build low-income public housing for returning vets. Nostrand and Sheepshead Bay Houses were erected in 1948. Herman Dolgon died from illness contracted during the War only one year later. The New York City Department of Parks & Recreation Department named a playground for Herman Dolgon in 1951.

References

 

American male writers
American sociologists
Living people
People from Brooklyn
1961 births
University of Michigan alumni